Alexander Wright was a Scottish football player and manager who played as a half back for Aberdeen, Heart of Midlothian, Greenock Morton and Queen of the South.

Playing career
Wright began playing with Aberdeen when he was only 16. He remained at the Dons until 1922, captaining the side in his latter years at the club. He was regarded as one of the best half backs in Scotland and gained representative honours when he played for the Scottish League against the English League. He made 143 appearances and scored 11 goals for the club. During the First World War he served with the Gordon Highlanders and Royal Engineers. When serving in London he also appeared at Millwall.  

Wright joined Heart of Midlothian for an estimated fee of £2500 in 1922 – a record fee for an Aberdeen player at the time –  and remained a prominent figure in Scottish football. For three successive seasons, he played in the annual East v West trial for the Scottish national team. Wright spent five seasons with Hearts. 

Wright joined Morton in 1927 for a fee of £800.

Managerial career
On 1 June 1928 when aged 31, he was interviewed by the Board of Directors from which he was announced as starting immediately as the first Secretary Manager of the Dumfries club, Queen of the South. He filled three roles at the club as he also signed himself as a player. In his first season, he was sent off when playing away in a 2-0 defeat at Albion Rovers on 24 November. He was at Palmerston Park until 1931.

References

1897 births 
Year of death unknown
Scottish footballers
Association football wing halves
Association football player-managers
Queen of the South F.C. players
Heart of Midlothian F.C. players
Aberdeen F.C. players
Millwall F.C. wartime guest players
British Army personnel of World War I
Gordon Highlanders soldiers
Royal Engineers soldiers
Greenock Morton F.C. players
Queen of the South F.C. managers
Aberdeen East End F.C. players
Scottish Football League players
Scottish Junior Football Association players
Date of birth unknown
Scottish football managers
Footballers from Aberdeen
Scottish Football League representative players
Scottish Football League managers